Martin Ingelsby (born November 24, 1978) is an American college basketball coach and the current head coach for the University of Delaware.

Ingelsby played basketball at Archbishop Carroll High School and Notre Dame. He was a standout point guard, starting for three seasons for the Fighting Irish. Following the close of his college career, Inglesby pursued a coaching career, landing at Wagner for one season before returning to his alma mater as the coordinator of basketball operations in 2003. In 2009, he was promoted to a full assistant on Mike Brey's staff. On May 24, 2016, Ingelsby was named the 24th head coach in Delaware history.

Ingelsby is the son of former National Basketball Association (NBA) player Tom Ingelsby. His brother Brad Ingelsby is a screenwriter.

Head coaching record

References

External links
 Delaware Fighting Blue Hens profile

1978 births
Living people
American men's basketball players
Archbishop John Carroll High School alumni
Basketball coaches from Pennsylvania
Basketball players from Pennsylvania
College men's basketball head coaches in the United States
Delaware Fightin' Blue Hens men's basketball coaches
Notre Dame Fighting Irish men's basketball coaches
Notre Dame Fighting Irish men's basketball players
People from Media, Pennsylvania
Point guards
Wagner Seahawks men's basketball coaches